Every Woman Dreams is the fifth studio album by American R&B singer Shanice. It was released on February 21, 2006, on her independent label Imajah/PlayTyme. Shanice's first release following her eight-year hiatus since her last album in 1999 on LaFace Records, the album debuted at number 194 on US Billboard 200 and number 30 on the R&B/Hip-Hop Albums chart with first-week sales of 5,901 copies. Two singles from the album were released: "Every Woman Dreams" and "Take Care of U".

Critical reception
AllMusic called the album "a polished and wholly accessible record. [Shanice's] marvelous voice sounds better than ever, and the music, which is sensual and energetic at once, should please fans of contemporary R&B." Chris Rizik from SoulTracks found that "a spin of the disc displays what appears to be two distinct, almost dichotomous albums: One a fairly bland effort at Vivian Green-like modern R&B and one a more classic pop/soul disc that highlights Shanice's formidable vocal prowess. Unfortunately you have to wade through the first to get to the second."

Track listing

Notes
 denotes co-producer

Charts

Release history

References

External links 
 

2006 albums
Shanice albums